Felid gammaherpesvirus 1 (FeHV-1) is a species of virus in the genus Percavirus, subfamily Gammaherpesvirinae, family Herpesviridae, and order Herpesvirales.

References 

Gammaherpesvirinae